Valentino Yuel (born 12 October 1994) is a South Sudanese professional footballer who plays as a winger for Umm Salal in the Qatar Stars League.

Club career

Western United
Yuel was signed by new club Western United ahead of the 2019–20 A-League. He left the club at the end of the 2019–20 season.

Newcastle Jets
Following 2.5 months without a club, including a trial period, Yuel joined Newcastle Jets on a two-year contract.

After not scoring for Western United in 9 appearances for the club, Yuel looked to prove himself in the A-League with Newcastle Jets. Yuel started strong, scoring 3 goals in 3 matches, however Yuel was kept to 1 goal in 8 matches as the Newcastle Jets set a club record equaling 6 consecutive losses.

Aluminium Arak

On 7 August 2022, Yuel announced on his Instagram page that he signed for Aluminium Arak

International career
On 8 June 2021, it was announced that Yuel had accepted a call up to the South Sudan national team. He made his debut on 31 January 2022 scoring the only goal in a 2-1 loss to Jordan.

Career statistics

International goals
Scores and results list South Sudan's goal tally first.

References

External links

1994 births
Living people
South Sudanese footballers
South Sudan international footballers
Australian soccer players
Association football midfielders
Western United FC players
Newcastle Jets FC players
National Premier Leagues players
A-League Men players
South Sudanese emigrants to Australia
Aluminium Arak players
Persian Gulf Pro League players
Umm Salal SC players
Qatar Stars League players
South Sudanese refugees
Refugees in Kenya
Soccer players from Adelaide
South Sudanese expatriate footballers
Australian expatriate soccer players
South Sudanese expatriate sportspeople in Iran
Australian expatriate sportspeople in Iran
Expatriate footballers in Iran